Tamil folk culture refers to folk arts and crafts of the Tamil people.  Folk arts and crafts are an integral part of the Tamil culture.  Tamil folk arts include music i.e. Naattupurapaattu, dance styles, songs, games, crafts, herbal medicine, food, sculpture, costumes, stories, proverbs, and mythology.

Tamil folk art is characterized by its local, participatory, and open source character.  Tamil folk culture often expresses village sensibilities, where most Tamils historically lived.  It is often contrasted with Bharatanatyam, and Carnatic music.

See also 
 Tamil culture